Harbułtowice  is a village in the administrative district of Gmina Kochanowice, within Lubliniec County, Silesian Voivodeship, in southern Poland.

References

Villages in Lubliniec County